Don Dietrich is a saxophonist and founding member of New York City based improvisational group, Borbetomagus.

Recently, he has become involved with the noise/free jazz "supergroup" The New Monuments (with C. Spencer Yeh and Ben Hall).

References

Avant-garde jazz musicians
American saxophonists
Living people
Year of birth missing (living people)
21st-century saxophonists